Charity Opara-Asonze  (born 20 May 1972 in Owerri, Imo State) is a former Nigerian track and field athlete who mainly competed in the 400 metres. She was in particular a successful relay runner, winning the silver medal at the 1996 Olympics.

Opara was banned between 1992 and 1996 for a positive drug test.

Personal bests
100 metres - 11.40 (1999)
200 metres - 22.60 (1992)
400 metres - 49.29 (1998)
Long jump - 6.55 m (1994)

Achievements

See also
Doping cases in athletics

References

External links



1972 births
Living people
People from Owerri
Igbo sportspeople
Nigerian female sprinters
Nigerian sportspeople in doping cases
Doping cases in athletics
Olympic athletes of Nigeria
Athletes (track and field) at the 1996 Summer Olympics
Athletes (track and field) at the 2000 Summer Olympics
Olympic silver medalists for Nigeria
Commonwealth Games bronze medallists for Nigeria
Commonwealth Games medallists in athletics
Athletes (track and field) at the 1990 Commonwealth Games
Medalists at the 1996 Summer Olympics
Olympic silver medalists in athletics (track and field)
African Games gold medalists for Nigeria
African Games medalists in athletics (track and field)
African Games silver medalists for Nigeria
Athletes (track and field) at the 1991 All-Africa Games
Olympic female sprinters
Sportspeople from Imo State
20th-century Nigerian women
Medallists at the 1990 Commonwealth Games